Ryegate may refer to:
 Ryegate, Montana, a town
 Ryegate, Vermont, a town

See also
 Reigate